The Gârbău is a left tributary of the river Secaș in Romania. It flows into the Secaș in Colibi.

References

Rivers of Romania
Rivers of Alba County